Trophy is the debut album by American noise-rock/post-metal band Made Out of Babies. It was released through Neurot Recordings on June 28, 2005. The album was produced, engineered, and mixed by Joel Hamilton at Atomic Recordings in Brooklyn and Leopard Studios in New Paltz with mastering by Doug Henderson.

Track listing

Personnel
Made Out of Babies
 Matthew Egan – drums
 Brendan "Bunny" Tobin – guitar
 Julie Christmas – vocals
 Eric Cooper – bass guitar
 Viva Stowell – bass guitar (tracks 2, 6 and 7)

Production
 Joel Hamilton – engineering, producer, mixing
 Doug Henderson – mastering

References

2005 debut albums
Made Out of Babies albums
Neurot Recordings albums